Stoneleigh-Burnham School (SBS) is a boarding and day school for girls in grades 7–12 and postgraduate year (PG Year).  Founded in 1869, the school is the result of the merger of five founding schools. At present, the School is located on a  campus in Greenfield, Massachusetts, United States, in the Pioneer Valley of New England in close proximity to the Five College Consortium.

SBS is affiliated with the International Coalition of Girls' Schools (ICGS), the National Association of Independent Schools (NAIS), the Association of Independent Schools in New England (AISNE), The Association of Boarding Schools (TABS), the Parents League of New York (PLNY), the Debating Association of New England Independent Schools (DANEIS), the Interscholastic Equestrian Association (IEA), and the British Horse Society (BHS).

SBS is accredited by the New England Association of Schools and Colleges (NEASC).

History
Stoneleigh-Burnham School is the result of the merger of five girls’ schools, dating back to 1869 with the Prospect Hill School of Greenfield, Massachusetts.

The history of Stoneleigh-Burnham School as a timeline:

 1869: Prospect Hill School founded in Greenfield, Massachusetts, by Reverend John Farwell Moors
 1877: The Classical School for Girls founded in Northampton, Massachusetts, by Bessie Talbot Capen and Mary A. Burnham due to the encouraged from then-President of Smith College, Laurenus Clarke Seelye, to provide young women with a better preparation for entrance into Smith College
 1885: The Classical School for Girls is renamed the Mary A. Burnham School, in honor of founder Burnham
 1909: The Elmhurst School is founded in Connersville, Indiana, by Isabel Cressler and Caroline Sumner, also at the urging of Seelye
 1926: Elmhurst School relocates to a larger campus in Rye, New Hampshire, and is renamed the Stoneleigh School for Girls
 1930: The Stoneleigh School for Girls merges with Prospect Hill School forming Stoneleigh-Prospect Hill School on what is today the Stoneleigh-Burnham School campus
 1968: Stoneleigh-Prospect Hill merges with the Mary A. Burnham School to form Stoneleigh-Burnham School
 2004: The Stoneleigh-Burnham Middle School is founded
 2019: Stoneleigh-Burnham celebrates 150 years of girls’ education

References

External links
 

Educational institutions established in 1869
Girls' schools in Massachusetts
Greenfield, Massachusetts
New England